Daniel Sang Ting (born 1 December 1992) is a professional footballer who plays as a defender for Malaysia Super League side Sabah, on loan from Johor Darul Ta'zim.

He previously played for Kuala Lumpur City and Negeri Sembilan in Malaysia, and Droylsden in England. He was on the books of Crewe Alexandra earlier in his career but were released in 2012 without playing any first team match with them. He has also played for Market Drayton Town, Congleton Town, and Ossett Albion.

Career statistics

Club

Honours

Kuala Lumpur City
 Malaysia Cup: 2021

References 

1992 births
Living people
Footballers from Cheshire
Sportspeople from Chester
English people of Malaysian descent
English footballers
Malaysian footballers
Association football defenders
Crewe Alexandra F.C. players
Market Drayton Town F.C. players
Congleton Town F.C. players
Ossett Albion A.F.C. players
Droylsden F.C. players
Negeri Sembilan FA players
PKNS F.C. players
Kuala Lumpur City F.C. players
Johor Darul Ta'zim F.C. players
Sabah F.C. (Malaysia) players
Malaysia Super League players